Massimo Mollica (19 March 1929 – 1 May 2013) was an Italian actor and stage director.

Born in Pace del Mela, Messina, the son of an elementary school teacher,  Mollica started acting at the university. His breakout role was Don Vito Cascio Ferro in the 1972 RAI television series Joe Petrosino. Mollica was mainly active as a stage actor and director, and he founded several theatres in Messina, including the San Carlino Theatre and the Teatro Pirandello.  His film roles include Pasquale Squitieri's Il prefetto di ferro and Francesco Rosi's Salvatore Giuliano.

References

Further reading 
 Grieco, Giuseppe. Massimo Mollica. La sua vita e il suo teatro. Sciascia, 1981.

External links 
 

1929 births
2013 deaths
Actors from the Province of Messina
Italian theatre directors
Italian male film actors
Italian male stage actors
Italian male television actors